Werner Marx (19 September 1910 in Mülheim – 21 November 1994 in Bollschweil Priory) was a German philosopher and expert on Heidegger's thought. He taught at the University of Freiburg.

Works
 The Meaning of Aristotle's "Ontology", Den Haag 1954
 Heidegger und die Tradition. Eine problemgeschichtliche Einführung in die Grundbestimmungen des Seins, Stuttgart 1961 (mehrere Auflagen, auch englisch: 1971)
 Die Bestimmung der Philosophie im Deutschen Idealismus, Stuttgart 1964 (Antrittsvorlesung vom 11. Mai 1964 in Freiburg i. Br.)
 Absolute Reflexion und Sprache, Frankfurt am Main 1967
 Verstehen und Auslegen, Freiburg 1967
 Das Spiel. Wirklichkeit und Methode, Freiburg i. Br. 1967
 Vernunft und Welt. Zwischen Tradition und anderem Anfang, Den Haag 1970 (auch englisch: Den Haag 1971)
 Hegels Phänomenologie des Geistes, Stuttgart 1971 (mehrere Auflagen; auch englisch: Hegel's Phenomenology of Spirit, Chicago 1975)
 Einführung in Aristoteles' Theorie vom Seienden, Freiburg i. Br. 1972
 Schelling: Geschichte, System, Freiheit, Freiburg 1977 (auch englisch: The Philosophy of F. W. J. Schelling: History, System, and Freedom, Indiana University Press, Bloomington 1984)
 als Hrsg.: Heidegger. Freiburger Universitätsvorträge zu seinem Gedenken. H. G. Gadamer, W. Marx, C. F. v. Weizsäcker, Freiburg/München 1977
 Gibt es auf Erden ein Mass? Grundbestimmungen einer nichtmetaphysischen Ethik, Hamburg 1983 (auch englisch: Is there a measure on earth? Foundations for a Nonmetaphysical Ethics, Chicago 1987)
 Ethos und Lebenswelt. Mitleidenkönnen als Mass, Hamburg 1986
 Die Phänomenologie Edmund Husserls - Eine Einführung, München 1987 (mehrere Auflagen)
 Towards a Phenomenological Ethics, New York 1992

References

20th-century German  philosophers
Hermeneutists
Phenomenologists
Continental philosophers
Daseinsanalysis
Existentialists
Philosophy academics
1910 births
Heidegger scholars
1994 deaths
Commanders Crosses of the Order of Merit of the Federal Republic of Germany
Academic staff of the University of Freiburg
20th-century German historians